Fredric Brown (October 29, 1906 – March 11, 1972) was an American science fiction, fantasy, and mystery writer. 
He is  known for his use of humor and for his mastery of the "short short" form—stories of 1 to 3 pages, often with ingenious plotting devices and surprise endings. Humor and a postmodern outlook carried over into his novels as well. One of his stories, "Arena", was adapted to a 1967 episode of the American television series Star Trek.

According to his wife, Fredric Brown hated to write. So he did everything he could to avoid it. He'd play his flute, challenge a friend to a game of chess, or tease Ming Tah, his Siamese cat. If Brown had trouble working out a certain story, he would hop on a long bus trip and just sit and think and plot for days on end.  When Brown finally returned home and sat himself in front of the typewriter, he produced work in a variety of genres: mystery, science fiction, short fantasy, black comedy–and sometimes, all of the above.

Works
Brown was born in Cincinnati. He began to sell mystery short stories to American magazines in 1936. His first science fiction story, "Not Yet the End", was published in the Winter 1941 issue of  Captain Future magazine.

His science fiction novel What Mad Universe (1949) is a parody of pulp sci-fi story conventions. Martians, Go Home (1955) is both a broad farce and a satire on human frailties as seen through the eyes of a billion jeering, invulnerable Martians who arrive not to conquer the world but to drive it crazy.

The Lights in the Sky Are Stars (1952) tells the story of an aging astronaut who is trying to get his beloved space program back on track after Congress has cut  its funding.

The short story Answer (1954) is thought to be the earliest representation of the "Yes, now there is a God." science fiction work that inspires a common myth or legend of a supercomputer that releases itself from human control. The story was originally published in Angels and Spaceships and the entire collection was later re-published in Star Shine for paperback adaptation.

Brown's flash fiction short story "The Hobbyist" (1961) is about a man named Sangstrom, who is in a desperate search for an undetectable poison but winds up getting more than he bargained for.

The short story "Arena" was used as the basis for the episode of the same name in the original Star Trek series. It was also adapted in 1973 for issue 4 of the Marvel Comics title Worlds Unknown.

Brown's first mystery novel, The Fabulous Clipjoint, won the Edgar Award for outstanding first mystery novel. It began a series starring Ed and Ambrose Hunter depicting how a young man gradually ripens into a detective under the tutelage of his uncle, an ex–private eye now working as a carnival concessionaire.

Many of his books make use of the threat of the supernatural or occult before the "straight" explanation comes at the end. For example, "Night of the Jabberwock" is a  humorous narrative of an extraordinary day in the life of a small-town newspaper editor.

The Screaming Mimi became a 1958 film starring Anita Ekberg and Gypsy Rose Lee. It was directed by Gerd Oswald, who also directed the "Fun and Games" episode of The Outer Limits. Its plot was similar to Brown's short story "Arena" and The Far Cry, noir suspense novels reminiscent of the work of Cornell Woolrich. The Lenient Beast experiments multiple first-person viewpoints, among them a gentle, deeply religious serial killer, and examines racial tensions between Anglos and Latinos in the US state of Arizona. Here Comes a Candle is told in straight narrative sections alternating with a radio script, a screenplay, a sportscast, a teleplay, a stage play, and a newspaper article.

Popularity and influence 
His short story "Arena" was voted by Science Fiction Writers of America as one of the top 20 science fiction stories written before 1965. His 1945 short story "The Waveries" was described by Philip K. Dick as "what may be the most significant—startlingly so—story sci-fi has yet produced". The opening of "Knock" is a complete two-sentence short-short story in itself.

Brown was one of three dedicatees of Robert A. Heinlein's 1961 novel Stranger in a Strange Land (the other two being Robert Cornog and Philip José Farmer).

In his non-fiction book Danse Macabre (1981), a survey of the horror genre since 1950, writer Stephen King includes an appendix of "roughly one hundred" influential books of the period: Fredric Brown's short-story collection Nightmares and Geezenstacks is included, and is, moreover, asterisked as being among those select works King regards as "particularly important".

Brown's short story "Naturally" was adapted as Geometria, a short film by director Guillermo del Toro. Another short story, "The Last Martian", was adapted as "Human Interest Story", an episode of Alfred Hitchcock Presents. In Spain, his short story "Nightmare in Yellow" was adapted as El cumpleaños (The Birthday), the debut episode of Historias para no dormir.

In The Annotated Alice (1960), Martin Gardner refers to Brown's Night of the Jabberwock as a "magnificently funny mystery novel ... an outstanding work of fiction that has close ties to the Alice books."

In the third episode of the third season of Amazon's adaptation of Philip K. Dick's The Man In The High Castle Oberstgruppenführer Smith remarks, when told of the possibility of travel between worlds, that "this is like something out of Fredric Brown", implying that Brown's work is known in the German-occupied areas of the former United States.

His novel The Lights in the Sky Are Stars gives its name to the final episode of 2007 anime Gurren Lagann.

Philosopher and novelist Umberto Eco in his book On Ugliness describes Brown's short story "Sentry" as, "one of the finest short stories produced by contemporary science fiction" and uses its twist ending as an example of how ugliness and aesthetics are relative to different cultures.

Bibliography

References

Sources

External links

 
 
 
  A short science fiction story.
 
 
 
 

  Includes a photo.
 
 
  Video.
 

1906 births
1972 deaths
American atheists
American mystery writers
American science fiction writers
20th-century American novelists
Crime novelists
Edgar Award winners
Pulp fiction writers
Writers from Cincinnati
American male novelists
20th-century American male writers
Novelists from Ohio